Asalatganj is a town in Kanpur Dehat district in the Indian state of Uttar Pradesh.

History
This is one of the older villages of Kanpur Dehat. It has a great connection to great Hindu Vedic history as there is an ancient Shivling is established in Droneshwar Temple which is being connected with Acharya Dron asper Myths popular in Local Hindu community.

It may be seen that hill of debris of old structures are nearby the Temple.
Later, it was known as Asalat Ganj (office for revenue collection in the period of British. It owns the biggest market (twice a week) in the whole district. Asalatganj is Gram Panchayat of 24 small villages. Almost 18 villages are joined to one another.

Janta Inter College and Gandhi Faize aam inter college are famous colleges for secondary education. Janta Inter college had been run as a nameless education centre in Raamshala before its establishment in a new building. Another old school in Asalat Ganj was established by Maulvi Chhedi Khan in 1930.
It is well connected by rail and road. The population of this town is about 10000. The main occupation of the people of the town is agriculture.asalatganj most papular and best education center moulana abul kalam azad faiz e am mahavidhalaya his founder sayad sajid ali. One of the most famous primary school which is known as Saraswati Gyan Mandir is also situated in asalatganj.

Education 

Maulana Abul Kalam Azad faiz e am Mahavidyalaya
Gandi faiz e am Inter College
Madrasa Arabia for Arabic Languages
Janta Inter College
R D N Mahavidyalaya
Chedi Khan shamshul qamar Inter College.
Sarswati Gyan Mandir.

Asalatganj Geography
It has an average elevation of 130 metres (429 feet).

External links
Asalatganj

Cities and towns in Kanpur Dehat district